The Ashbourne Cup is an Irish camogie tournament played each year to determine the national champion university or third level college. The Ashbourne Cup is the highest division in inter-collegiate camogie. The competition features many of the current stars of the game and is sometimes known as the 'Olympics of Camogie' because of the disproportionate number of All Star and All-Ireland elite level players who participate each year Since 1972 it has been administered by the Higher Education committee of the Camogie Association.

Format
Each of the 4 @3rdLevelCamogie competitions follow a group stage and knockout format. Teams are generally divided into 2 groups with the top 2 in each group advancing to the semi finals and 3rd place in both groups contesting the shield final. Each competition operates on a promotion and relegation basis.

History 
The competition is the brainchild of Agnes O'Farrelly (1874–1951), founder member (1914) and president (1914–51) of the UCD camogie club who later served as president of the Camogie Association of Ireland in 1941–2. In 1915 she persuaded her friend, Irish language activist William Gibson, aka Liam Mac Giolla Bhríde (1868–1942), second Lord Ashbourne, to donate a trophy for the camogie intervarsity competition. The first game of intercollegiate camogie took place between University College Dublin and University College Cork on 18 April 1915. NUI Galway (then University College, Galway) joined the competition in 1916, Queen's University Belfast in 1934, and NUI Maynooth (then St Patrick's College), New University of Ulster, Coleraine, and Trinity College, Dublin in 1972. Apart from 1934 to 1937, until 1960 the competition was played on a league basis, and since then the concluding stages have been played together on a single weekend in mid-February. There was no competition in 1943, due to war-time restrictions, and the competition remained unfinished in 1963, when University College Dublin fielded an ineligible player for the final, which was drawn and never replayed. University College Cork claimed the title. The Ashbourne Cup semi finals and finals are now played alongside the Purcell (2nd Division), Fr. Meachair (3rd Division) and Uí Mhaolagáin Cups (4th Division) on the second weekend of February.

Purcell Cup
The CCAO also oversees the Purcell Cup (Division 2), which has been contested since 1977. The Purcell Cup, was donated by Úna Uí Phuirséil, President of the Camogie Association 1976–78, and her husband Pádraig Puirséil, Gaelic games correspondent for the Irish Press 1954–78. Mary Immaculate College, Limerick defeated Ulster Polytechnic by 3–0 to 0–1 in the first final in St Patrick's. Drumcondra on 6 March 1977.

Fr Meachair Cup
Colleges who do not compete in the Ashbourne and Purcell Cups play for a cup named after Fr Gearóid Ó Meachair (Gerry Meagher, d1982), from Cappawhite, Co Tipperary, founder and popular trainer of the NUI Maynooth camogie team. Inaugurated in 1986, the Fr. Meachair Cup is now competed by both college senior and intermediate teams.

O'Mhaolagáin Cup
The remaining teams not in the first three championships participate in the 4th division or Uí Mhaolagáin cup, with the format following the group and knockout stages implemented in the other competitions. The trophy is named for Camogie Association President of 1991–4, Brídín Uí Mhaolagáin.

Ashbourne Cup Winners

Highlights & Incidents
Highlights and incidents of the championship history include:

 The 1918 competition played before record crowds of up to 4,000 for each of three matches in Terenure over the weekend of Feb 16–18, Dublin beating Cork on Friday, Galway and Cork drawing one goal each on Saturday and Dublin beating Galway 2–0 to 1–1 on Sunday to secure the trophy when Nora Cleary's goal from a 60-yard shot proving the highlight of the weekend, Margaret McGrane scoring Dublin's second goal
 Harry Diamond, member of Northern Ireland Parliament, refereed the 1935 final, the first to be hosted by Queen's University
 Some members of the UCG winning 1917 team refused to have their names engraved on the cup in the Irish language, something that brought their future selection into doubt.
 The Galway, Antrim and Dublin county boards suspended UCG, Queen's and UCD for six months for taking part in the 1949 Ashbourne Cup as they had refused instructions not to play against UCC, affiliated to the Cork board which was disaffiliated from camogie's central body for the term of a complex eight-year split in the Association.
 The inconclusive 1961 final when the Ashbourne Cup committee decided one of the UCD players was ineligible. The match was drawn 2-1 each and never replayed, with UCC claiming victory.
 The 1962 competition when snow was cleared from the field, the semi-finals played on the following day and the final completed a fortnight later when Anne Duane's late goal gave Dublin a late victory in one of the best Ashbourne cup ties of the 12-a-side era.
 Galway's breakthrough in 1965 powered by goalkeeper Eileen Naughton who held Queen's scoreless in the semi-final and Dublin could manage just one point in the final,
 The 1966 semi-final in which Dublin beat Queen's by an astonishing 17–6 to nil, as Ann Carroll inspired Dublin to victory in her first appearance in a competition where she was to become the outstanding personality over a five-year period.
 The 1969 semi-finals played in four inches of snow on the Malone Road sports fields in Belfast. The final was eventually played in Athlone when Dublin won with the help of three goals from Joan Traynor.
 In 1972 Trinity College, NUI Maynooth and the University of Ulster, Coleraine brought the number of teams competing in the Ashbourne Cup to seven
 Margery Doohan's performance in the 1970 final, her five goals won her Irish Press sports personality of the week in a year when UCD won without their injured captain Ann Carroll
 Cork's six in a row 1972–77 with players like Val O'Dwyer and Aideen McCarthy and three goal hero of 1977 Noreen McCarthy, their toughest contest in the period may have been the 1976 quarter-final 2–6 to 3–2 victory over Maynooth, one of the best matches in the 12-a-side era of Ashbourne history, in which Angela Downey scored 2-2. Maynooth came closest to winning the Fitzgibbon when it could draw on the services of the iconic Angela Downey between 1975 and 1979, appearing in two finals.
 The 1974 first round match between UCG and Queen's played in perhaps the worst conditions ever for a camogie match - the ball became lodged in a mud pool for a considerable period
 Dublin's nine victories in eleven years in the 1980s, launched by Edel Murphy's scores in a closely fought final against UCC in 1980 and  spearheaded by players such as Germaine Noonan, Marie Connell and Breda Kenny in subsequent years.
 Cork's eight goals in arctic conditions at Santry in 1985, decisively defeating UCD with great displays by Claire Cronin, Patsy Kenelry and three goal hero Norma Delaney.
 The emergence of Queen's in 1991 led by Deirdre O'Doherty, Joan Tobin and Mary Black followed closely by Jordanstown in 1992 marking the high point of Colleges camogie in Ulster, followed by Limerick's victory over Waterford in an all-newcomers final in 1995 when Sinead Millea's prolific scoring gave Limerick victory.
 Limerick's breakthrough in 1995 which led to six titles in 11 years including a treble in 2004-6
 The first 15-a-side final of a major camogie competition in 1999 when Waterford celebrated their first success and the first non-University success thanks to Mary Walshe's 39th minute winning goal.
 Waterford's 2009-13 five in a row, powered by All Ireland stars from Cork and Wexford and Kilkenny, who supplied five of their forwards on the 2012 team

Ashbourne Cup Champion Colleges

 1915 UCD
 1916 UCD
 1917 NUIG
 1918 UCD
 1919 UCC
 1920 NUIG
 1921 UCD
 1922 UCC
 1923 UCC
 1924 UCC
 1925 UCC
 1926 UCC
 1927 UCC
 1928 NUIG
 1929 UCC
 1930 NUIG
 1931 UCC
 1932 UCC
 1933 UCD
 1934 UCC
 1935 UCD
 1936 UCC
 1937 UCC
 1938 UCD
 1939 UCD
 1940 UCD
 1941 UCD
 1942 UCD
 1943 Not Played
 1944 UCC
 1945 UCC
 1946 UCD
 1947 UCC
 1948 NUIG
 1949 NUIG
 1950 UCD
 1951 UCC
 1952 UCD
 1953 UCD
 1954 UCD
 1955 UCD
 1956 NUIG
 1957 NUIG
 1958 UCD
 1959 UCD
 1960 UCD
 1961 UCD
 1962 UCD
 1963 UCC
 1964 NUIG
 1965 UCC
 1966 UCD
 1967 UCC
 1968 NUIG
 1969 UCD
 1970 UCD
 1971 UCD
 1972 UCC
 1973 UCC
 1974 UCC
 1975 UCC
 1976 UCC
 1977 UCC
 1978 NUIG
 1979 NUIG
 1980 UCD
 1981 UCD
 1982 UCD
 1983 UCD
 1984 UCD
 1985 UCC
 1986 UCD
 1987 UCD
 1988 UCD
 1989 NUIG
 1990 NUIG
 1991 QUB
 1992 UUJ
 1993 UUJ
 1994 NUIG
 1995 UL
 1996 UCC
 1997 UUJ
 1998 UCC
 1999 WIT
 2000 UCC
 2001 WIT
 2002 UCC
 2003 UCC
 2004 UL
 2005 UL
 2006 UL
 2007 UCD
 2008 UCD
 2009 WIT
2010 WIT
2011 WIT.
2012 WIT
 2013 WIT
 2014 UL
 2015 WIT
 2016 UL
 2017 UL
 2018 UL
 2019 UL
 2020 UL
 2021 Not Played
 2022 DCU

Purcell Cup Champion Colleges

 1977 Mary I
 1978 Mary I
 1979 Ulster Poly
 1980 Thomond
 1981 Thomond
 1982 St Mary's, Belfast
 1983 Mary I
 1984 Ulster Poly
 1986 Thomond
 1987 Thomond
 1988 Thomond
 1989 Mary I
 1990 Waterford RTC
 1991 Thomond
 1992 Waterford RTC
 1993 Athlone RTC
 1994 UCC
 1995 Athlone RTC
 1996 Maynooth
 1997 Queen's Belfast
 1998 Mary I
 1999 Limerick IT
 2000 UUJ
 2001 Cork Institute of Technology (CIT)
 2002 Carlow
 2003 UUJ
 2004 Athlone IT
 2005 Garda College
 2006 UUJ
 2007 Athlone IT
 2008 Queen's Belfast
 2009 Athlone IT
 2010 DIT
 2011 Queen's Belfast
 2012 DCU
 2013 DCU
 2014 UCC 
 2015 Mary I
 2016 Cork IT
 2017 DIT
 2018 NUIG
 2019 Maynooth University 
 2020 UCD
 2021 Not Played
 2022 TU Dublin (formerly DIT)

Fr Meachair Cup Champion Colleges

 2012 Mary Immaculate College, Limerick
 2013 St Patrick's College Drumcondra
 2014 IT Carlow
 2015 IT Carlow
 2016 Trinity College Dublin
 2017 St Patrick's College Drumcondra
 2018
 2019 Athlone IT
 2020 Trinity College Dublin
 2021 Not Played
 2022 UCC

Ashbourne Cup Finals
Until 1960 the series was played as a round robin over different weekends in the winter. The first figure in this table is the number of goals scored (equal to 3 points each) and the second total is the number of points scored, the figures are combined to determine the winner of a match in Gaelic Games. The results, dates and venues of finals since 1960 have been:

 1960 Feb 28 UC Dublin 4-03 UC Galway 1-01 Galway
 1961 Feb 11 UC Dublin 5-00 Queen's Belfast 0-00 Cherryvale
 1962 Mar 4 UC Dublin 6-01 UC Cork 5-01  Belfield
 1963 Feb 24 UC Cork 2-01 UC Dublin 2-01 Mardyke
 1964 Feb 9 UC Galway 4-02 UC Cork 0-01 Pearse Stadium
 1965 Feb 27 UC Cork 3-02 UC Dublin 0-02 Cherryvale
 1966 Feb 20 UC Dublin 3-05 UC Cork 2-04 Belfield
 1967 Feb 7 UC Cork 8-02 UC Dublin 4-02 Mardyke
 1968 Feb 24 UC Galway 1-02 UC Dublin 0-02 Pearse Stadium
 1969 Mar 9 UC Dublin 6-02 UC Galway 0-01 Athlone
 1970 Feb 8 UC Dublin 6-02 UC Galway 1-00 Croke Park
 1971 Feb 14 UC Dublin 4-02 UC Cork 3-03 Mardyke
 1972 Feb 20 UC Cork 1-09 UC Dublin 2-01 Pearse Stadium
 1973 Feb 25 UC Cork 3-06 UC Dublin 3-01 Belfield
 1974 Feb 17 UC Cork 5-06 UC Galway 1-08 Mardyke
 1975 Feb 16 UC Cork 2-03 UC Dublin 1-02 Maynooth
 1976 Feb 15 UC Cork 5-02 UC Galway 1-02 Pearse Stadium
 1977 Feb 13 UC Cork 6-02 UC Dublin 3-05 Santry
 1978 Feb 12 UC Galway 3-02 Maynooth 2-00 Corrigan Park
 1979 Feb 12 UC Galway 4-02 Maynooth 0-04 Coleraine
 1980 Feb 10 UC Dublin 3-04 UC Cork 3-01 Belfield
 1981 Feb 15 UC Dublin 1-04 UC Cork 0-05 Mardyke
 1982 Feb 14 UC Dublin 3-01 UC Cork 0-03 Belfield
 1983 Feb 13 UC Dublin 2-05 UC Cork 1-07 Pearse Stadium
 1984 Feb 12 UC Dublin 4-06 Queen's Belfast 2-01 Casement Park
 1985 Feb 10 UC Cork 8-00 UC Galway 0-06 Santry
 1986 Feb 9 UC Dublin 5-08 Queen's Belfast 0-02 Coleraine
 1987 Feb 15 UC Dublin 5-05 UC Galway 0-03 Belfield
 1988 Feb 14 UC Dublin 2-03 UC Galway 2-01 Mardyke
 1989 Feb 12 UC Galway 1-02 UC Dublin 0-02 Jordanstown
 1990 Feb 11 UC Dublin 3-01 UC Galway 0-06 Maynooth
 1991 Feb 10 Queen's Belfast 3-06 UC Galway 1-3 Turloughmore
 1992 Feb 9 UU Jordanstown 6-03 Queen's Belfast 3-04 Casement Park
 1993 Feb 21 UU Jordanstown 3-02 Queen's Belfast 2-03 Belfield
 1994 Feb 13 UC Galway 3-05 UU Jordanstown 1-09 Coleraine
 1984 Feb 12 UC Dublin 4-06 Queen's Belfast 2-01 Casement Park
 1995 Feb 12 U Limerick 0-13 Waterford RTC 1-05 Mardyke
 1996 Feb 11 UC Cork 3-03 UU Jordanstown 1-05 Belfield
 1997 Feb 22 UUJ 1-10 UC Dublin 2-05 Casement Park
 1998 Feb 22 UC Cork 1-07 Waterford IT 1-06 Walsh Park
 1999 Feb 14 Waterford IT 1-06 UC Cork 0-04 Limerick
 2000 Feb 20 UC Cork 2-03 UC Dublin 1-05 Dangan, Galway
 2001 Feb 17 U Limerick 2-06 Waterford IT 1-08 Athlone
 2002 Feb 17 UC Cork 1-11 Waterford IT 1-04 Ballinlough, Cork
 2003 Feb 16 UC Cork 1-10 UC Dublin 0-06 Mardyke
 2004 Feb 15 U Limerick 6-5 UC Dublin 1-08 O'Toole Park Crumlin
 2005 Feb 27 U Limerick 0-12 UC Dublin 1-04 Ballygunner
 2006 Feb 26 U Limerick 0-13 UC Dublin 1-09 Limerick
 2007 Feb 23 UC Dublin 2-10 UC Cork 1-04 Ballinderreen
 2008 Feb 24 UC Dublin 5-09 Waterford IT 0-09 Casement Park
 2009 Feb 22 Waterford IT 1-09 UC Dublin 1-06 Páirc Uí Rinn
 2010 Feb 21 Waterford IT 0-11 UC Cork 1-06 Cork IT
 2011 Feb 20 Waterford IT 2-10 UC Cork 2-02 Pearse Stadium
 2012 Feb 19 Waterford IT 2-08 U Limerick 0-04 Carraiganore 
 2013 Feb 17 Waterford IT 3-13 U Limerick 2-15 North Campus, UL
 2014 Feb 16 U Limerick 0-12 Waterford IT 1-08 QUB Grounds, Upper Malone, Belfast
 2015 Feb 15 Waterford IT 2-12 U Limerick 0-12 DCU Sports Campus
 2016 Feb 14 U Limerick 3-12 UC Cork 4-07  Gort
 2017 Feb 12 U Limerick 2-08 UC Cork 1-07 Abbotstown 
 2018 U Limerick 0-15 UCC 1-09 Mallow complex
 2019 February 10 U Limerick 3-08 UC Cork 0-08 Mallow complex
 2020 U Limerick 3-12 UCC 0-10 - WIT Arena
 2022 DCU DÉ 1-14 UCD 0-05 - WIT Arena

Purcell Cup Finals

 2004 Athlone IT
 2005 Garda College, Templemore
 2006 University of Ulster, Jordanstown
 2007 Athlone IT
 2008 Queen's University
 2009 Athlone IT
 2010 DIT
 2011 Queen's University 2-10 DCU 0-07  NUIG
 2012 DCU 4-07 Queen's University 0-04 Waterford IT Sports Campus
 2013 DCU 2-11 Mary I Limerick 1-09 North Campus, UL
 2014 UCC 1-11 DIT 0-07 QUB Grounds, Upper Malone, Belfast
 2015 Mary I 1-12 DIT 0-08 (Replay) Ballykelly
 2016 Cork IT 1-12 Maynooth University 0-04 Gort
 2017 DIT 1-08 Maynooth University 1-06 Abbotstown 
 2018 NUIG
 2019 Maynooth University 1-11 NUIG 1-10 Mallow complex
 2020 UCD 1-06 TU Dublin 0-05 - WIT Arena
 2021 Not Played
 2022 TU Dublin 0-12  NUIG 0-08  WIT Arena

Fr Meachair Cup Finals

 2012 Mary I Limerick 0-15 St Pats Drumcondra 0-03 Waterford IT Sports Campus
 2013 St Pats Drumcondra 2-05 Carlow IT 1-03 North Campus, UL
 2014 Carlow IT 1-09 St Pats Drumcondra 1-05 QUB Grounds, Upper Malone, Belfast
 2015 Carlow IT 2-10 St. Mary's 1-10 DCU Sports Campus
 2016 Trinity College Dublin 1-10 Athlone IT 0-08 Gort
 2017 St Patrick's College Drumcondra 3-08 Athlone IT 1-03 Abbotstown
 2018
 2019 Athlone IT 1-11 Trinity College Dublin 1-04
 2020 Trinity College Dublin 0-13 UCD 0-08 - WIT Arena
 2021 Not Played
 2022 UCC 1-09  UCD 0-08 - WIT Arena

Ashbourne All-Stars
For many years a Combined Universities team was selected after the Ashbourne Cup event to play Cork county team for the Cronin Cup. Later the Combined Universities played the Combined Colleges. Higher Education] committee of Cumann Camógaíochta na nGael instituted Ashbourne All-Stars for the best players in each position at the end of the tournament.

2006
Rosanna Kenneally (WIT & Tipperary), Catherine O'Loughlin (UCD & Wexford), Angela Walsh (UL & Cork), Rena Buckley (UCD & Cork), Jenny Duffy (Cork IT & Cork), Anna Geary (UL & Cork), Michelle Shortt (Garda College & Tipperary), Louise Mahony (UCD & Laois), Colette Desmond (UCC & Cork), Laura Linnane (NUIG & Galway), Rachel Moloney (UCC & Cork), Cora Hennessy (Cork IT & Tipperary), Marie O'Connor (Garda College & Kilkenny), Amanda O'Regan (UL & Cork), Sharon Daly (UCD & Offaly)

2007
Mags Darcy (UCD & Wexford), Clodagh Flanagan (UCD & Kildare),   Jennifer Browne (UCC & Cork), Mairead Luttrell (UCD & Tipperary), Mary Leacy (UCD & Wexford), Fionnuala Carr (Jordanstown & Down), Cathriona Foley (UCC & Cork), Rena Buckley (UCD & Cork), Julianne Woodcock (UCD & Kilkenny), Claire McMahon (NUIG & Clare), Brenda Hanney (Cork IT & Galway), Aine Lyng (UL & Waterford), Susie O'Carroll (UCD & Kildare), Ursula Jacob (WIT & Wexford), Marie O'Connor (Garda College & Kilkenny)

2008
Rosanna Kenneally (WIT & Wateford), Therese Shortt (WIT & Tipperary), Mary Leacy (UCD & Wexford), Michelle Casey (Garda College & Liemrick), Sheila Sullivan (UL & Offaly), Fionnuala Carr (Jordanstown & Down), Cathriona Foley (UCC & Cork), Rena Buckley (UCD & Cork), Ann Dalton (UCD & Kilkenny), Susie O'Carroll (UCD & Kildare), Aine Lyng (UL & Waterford), Fiona Lafferty (UL & Clare), Ursula Jacob (WIT & Wexford), Aoife McLoughney (UCC & Tipperary), Una Leacy (UCC & Wexford) .

2009
Mags Darcy (UCD & Wexford), Keeva Fennelly (WIT & Kilkenny), Mairéad Luttrell (UCD & Tipperary), Lorraine Ryan (NUIG & Galway), Mary Leacy (UCD & Wexford), Kelly-Anne Cottrell (WIT & Kilkenny), Stacey Redmond (WIT & Wexford), Rena Buckley (UCD & Cork), Ann Dalton (WIT & Kilkenny), Collette Dormer (WIT & Kilkenny), Aoife McLoughney (UCC & Tipperary), Susie O'Carroll (UCD & Kildare), Ursula Jacob (WIT & Wexford), Michelle Quilty (WIT & Kilkenny)

2010
Eleanor Mallon (Jordanstown & Antrim), Mairéad Luttrell (UCD & Tipperary), Sabrina Larkin (UL & Tipperary), Gráinne Stapleton (UCD & Kilkenny), Collette Dormer (WIT & Kilkenny), Fionnuala Carr (UCC & Down), Jill Horan (UCC & Cork), Katrina Parrock (WIT & Wexford), Alison Maguire (UCD & Dublin), Gráinne Kenneally (UCC & Waterford), Áine Lyng (UL & Kilkenny), Patricia Jackman (WIT & Waterford), Fiona Lafferty (UL & Clare), Ursula Jacob (WIT & Wexford), Deirdre Twomey (NUIG & Cork)

2011
Susan Earner (UCC & Galway) Collette Dormer (WIT & Kilkenny), Leann Fennelly (UCD & Kilkenny), Julie Brien (UCC & Galway) Ann Dalton (WIT & Kilkenny), Michaela Morkan (NUIG & Offaly), Patricia Jackman (WIT & Waterford) Katrina Parrock (WIT & Wexford), Chloe Morey (NUIG & Clare) Michaela Convery (Jordanstown & Antrim), Katie Power (WIT & Kilkenny), Lisa Bolger (UL & Offaly) Katriona Mackey (UCC & Cork), Denise Gaule (WIT & Kilkenny), Michelle Quilty (WIT & Kilkenny)

2012
Emma Staunton (UCD & Kilkenny), Ruth Jones (WIT & Kilkenny), Sarah Anne Fitzgerald (WIT & Laois), Shonagh Curran (UL & Waterford), Patricia Jackman (WIT & Waterford), Susan Vaughan (UL & Cork), Niamh O'Dea (UL & Cork), Lisa Bolger (UL & Wexford), Maria Walsh (UL & Cork), Joanne Casey (UCC & Cork) Sara Louise Carr (Jordanstown & Down), Denise Gaule (WIT & Kilkenny), Marie Dargan (WIT & Kilkenny), Katie Power (WIT & Kilkenny), Katrina Parrock (WIT & Wexford),

2020
Edel McNamara (WIT & Clare), Róisín Phelan (UCC & Kilkenny), Aisling Brennan (WIT & Offaly), Ciara Doyle (WIT & Clare), Kerrie Finnegan (TU Dublin & Dublin), Karen Kennedy (UL & Tipperary), Sibéal Harney (UCC & Waterford), Mairéad Burke (UL & Galway), Chloe Sigerson (UCC & Cork), Beth Carton (UL & Waterford), Orla Cronin (UCC & Cork), Laura Stack (Trinity & Limerick), Chloe Foxe(UCD & Wexford), Áine ní Chrothaigh (Marino & Waterford), Siobhán McGrath (UL & Galway)

2021
Competitions not Played due to COVID19.

2022
Sarah Ahern (UCC & Cork), Ciara O'Shea (DCU & Kilkenny), Sorcha Ryan (UCD & Tipperary), Sarah Delaney (UCD & Tipperary), Jane Cass (DCU & Kilkenny), Niamh Deely (DCU & Kilkenny), Issy Davis (UCD & Dublin), Ciara O'Connor (DCU & Wexford), Jody Couch (TU Dublin & Dublin), Tiffanie Fitzgerald (NUIG & Kilkenny), Kate Kenny (DCU & Offaly), Steffi Fitzgerald (DCU & Kilkenny), Abby Flynn (DCU & Waterford), Emma Murphy (UCC & Cork), Megan Shields (TU Dublin & Cavan)

Purcell All-Stars
Purcell All-Stars were first selected from the Purcell Cup participant teams in 2006, rewarding the best players in each position at the end of the tournament.

2010
Martina O'Brien (IT Tralee); Karen Mullins (DIT), Therese Lynn (Maynooth), Sarah Ryan (DIT); Rachel Ruddy (Trinity), Edwina Keane (IT Tralee), Aileen O'Loughlin (DIT); Jane Dolan (DIT), Paula Kenny (Garda College); Christine Kenny (DCU), Keelin Bradley (Queen's), Niamh Mulcahy (Mary I); Shauna Jordan (Queen's), Colette McSorley (Queen's), Louise Walsh (Maynooth)

2011
Laura Quinn (QUB & Derry); Gráinne Quinn (DIT & Dublin), Kate Lynch (Mary I Limerick & Clare), Laura Twomey (DCU & Dublin); Mairead Short (QUB & Armagh), Cathriona Foley (Trinity & Cork), Emma Brennan (DCU & Cork); Jane Dolan (DIT & Meath), Keelan Bradley (QUB & Derry); Cathy Bowes (DIT & Galway), Colette McSorley (QUB & Armagh), Aoife Burke (DIT & Laois); Sinead Cassidy (QUB & Derry), Orlaith Murphy (IT Tralee & Cork), Joeleen Hoary (DIT & Dublin);

2012
Gráinne Smyth (DIT & Dublin), Rebecca Cleere (Maynooth & Kilkenny), Lisa Carey (DCU & Kilkenny), Danielle McCrystal (QUB & Derry), Mairéad Power (DCU & Kilkenny), Emma Brennan (DCU & Carlow), Kristina Troy (Maynooth & Meath), Katie Campbell (Mary I Limerick & Limerick), Laura Twomey (DCU & Dublin), Orlaith Walsh (St Pats, Drumcondra & Kilkenny), Sinéad Cassidy (QUB & Derry), Ciara Donnelly (QUB & Armagh), Orla Durkan (DCU & Dublin), Naomi Carroll (Mary I Limerick & Clare), Denise Luby (Cork IT & Cork)

References

External links
 History of the Ashbourne and Purcell Cups on camogie.ie
 Official Camogie Website
 On The Ball Official Camogie Magazine  Issue 1 and issue 2
 College websites Queen's University Belfast  University College Dublin
 Report on RTE online of 2009 final, Waterford IT 1-9 UCD 1-6
 Report of Ashbourne Cup final in Irish Times, February 22 2009, WIT 1-9 UCD 1-6 at Páirc Uí Rinn
 "2007: UCD land Ashbourne Cup for first time in 19 years," from the Irish Times
 Ashbourne Cup semi-final 2008 from the Irish Times

 
Camogie cup competitions
Gaelic games competitions at Irish universities
1915 establishments in Ireland